"Love Flies" is the nineteenth single by L'Arc-en-Ciel, released on October 27, 1999. The b-side is Yukihiro's remix version of the song "Shinjitsu to Gensou to" from their 1999 album Ark. The single debuted at number 1 on the Oricon chart, and charted for another 13 weeks.

Track listing

* Remix by Yukihiro.

References

1999 singles
L'Arc-en-Ciel songs
Oricon Weekly number-one singles
Songs written by Hyde (musician)
Songs written by Ken (musician)
Ki/oon Music singles
1999 songs